Iraqis in Germany include migrants from Iraq to Germany, as well as their descendants. The number of Iraqis and Iraqi-Germans in Germany is estimated at around 310,000 people. The Iraqi community is ethnically, culturally and linguistically diverse and includes Mesopotamian Arabs, Kurds, Iraqi Turkmen, Mandaeans, Assyrians and Yezidis.

History and population
The number of Iraqi citizens in Germany is estimated at around 250,000. Between 2010 and 2019, Germany granted around 70% of Iraqi asylum applications, although most of these are subject to regular review.

In 2019, Germany received 13,700 applications for asylum from Iraqis. The country is already home to a sizeable Iraqi population, many of whom were granted protection by the German authorities after fleeing persecution from Saddam Hussein’s former regime.

However, Germany has adopted another policy towards Iraqi refugees which has distinguished it from all other EU states, the German Federal Ministry of the Interior has taken the unique step of systematically revoking the refugee status of thousands of Iraqis who were granted protection before 2003. Since the threat of persecution from the Iraqi Ba’ath regime is no longer present, 18,000 Iraqi refugees who entered the country before the 2003 invasion have thus had their refugee status revoked, placing them in a situation of uncertainty and precariousness. In June 2007, the German government asked the asylum authorities to temporarily suspend the revocation of refugee status for certain groups of Iraqis such as those from Baghdad, single women, and members of religious or ethnic minorities such as Iraqi Assyrians.
70,000+

Notable people
Reem Alabali-Radovan, politician 
Laith Al-Deen,  pop musician born to Iraqi father and German mother
Dunja Hayali,  journalist and television presenter.
, crowned Miss Germany in 1996 (Turkish-Iraqi origin)
Karo Murat,  professional boxer
Najem Wali,  novelist and journalist
Khalid al-Maaly,  writer and publisher
Iqbal al-Qazwini,  journalist and novelist.
Claudia Basrawi,  German actress and writer born to Iraqi father and German mother
Rafid Ahmed Alwan al-Janabi,  German citizen who defected from Iraq
Faris Al-Sultan,  Ironman World Championship Born to Iraqi father and German mother
Alexander Ridha, Electronic music record producer, songwriter, and DJ

See also
 Iraqis
 Iraqi diaspora
 Iraqi diaspora in Europe
 Immigration to Germany
 Germany–Iraq relations
 Assyrians in Germany
 Kurds in Germany
 Turks in Germany
 Arabs in Germany

Notes

References

Arabs in Germany
 
 
Middle Eastern diaspora in Germany
Ethnic groups in Germany
Iraqi emigrants to Germany